

 Baudin Rocks Conservation Park is a protected area occupying Baudin Rocks on the south east coast of South Australia about  North-northwest of Robe. In 1965, the island was declared as a Fauna Reserve under the Fauna Conservation Act 1964 following a request from the Kingston Branch of the National Trust of South Australia to declare ‘a reserve to afford protection to the wildlife population’. The protected area status was retained following the enactment of the National Parks and Wildlife Act 1972 in 1972 when it was renamed as the Baudin Rocks Conservation Park. 

The conservation park is categorised as an IUCN Category IA protected area.  In 1980, it was listed on the now-defunct Register of the National Estate.

See also
 Protected areas of South Australia

References

Further reading

External links
Entry for Baudin Rocks Conservation Park on protected planet

Conservation parks of South Australia
Protected areas established in 1965
1965 establishments in Australia
Limestone Coast
South Australian places listed on the defunct Register of the National Estate